A wheel is a type of algebra (in the sense of universal algebra) where division is always defined.  In particular, division by zero is meaningful. The real numbers can be extended to a wheel, as can any commutative ring.

A wheel can be regarded as the equivalent of a commutative ring (and semiring) where addition and multiplication are not a group but respectively a commutative monoid and a commutative monoid with involution.

Definition 
A wheel is an algebraic structure , in which
  is a set,
  is a unary operation,
and satisfying the following properties:
  ( is an involution)
  ( is multiplicative)

Algebra of wheels 

  in the general case

Other identities that may be derived are
 
 
 

 
 

If negation can be defined as above then the subset  is a commutative ring, and every commutative ring is such a subset of a wheel. If  is an invertible element of the commutative ring then .

Examples

Wheel of fractions 
Define the congruence relation  on  via
 means that there exist  such that .
 (additive identity)
 (multiplicative identity)
 (reciprocal operation)
 (addition operation)
 (multiplication operation)

Projective line and Riemann sphere 

The special case of the above starting with a field produces a projective line extended to a wheel by adjoining a bottom element noted ⊥, where .  The projective line is itself an extension of the original field by an element , where  for any element  in the field.  However,  is still undefined on the projective line, but is defined in its extension to a wheel.

Starting with the real numbers, the corresponding projective "line" is geometrically a circle, and then the extra point  gives the shape that is the source of the term "wheel".  Or starting with the complex numbers instead, the corresponding projective "line" is a sphere (the Riemann sphere), and then the extra point gives a 3-dimensional version of a wheel.

See also 
 NaN

Citations

References 
 (a draft)
 (also available online here).

Fields of abstract algebra